The Millennial Anniversary of Hanoi was celebrated from 1 to 10 October 2010, the 1,000th anniversary of the foundation of the capital Thăng Long by the emperor Lý Thái Tổ. Many events were held in 2009 and 2010 to commemorate the anniversary, including cultural and traditional festivals as well as inaugurations of major projects in Hanoi.

Myth
According to the Đại Việt sử ký toàn thư, Lý Thái Tổ, the first emperor of the Lý dynasty, decided to move the capital of the country from Hoa Lư to Đại La in the seventh month of the lunar calendar, 1010. When the convoy of Lý Thái Tổ arrived in Đại La, a golden dragon rose beside the emperor's boat, hence Lý Thái Tổ changed the name of the new capital from Đại La to Thăng Long (昇 龍, literally "The Rising Dragon").

Commemorative projects
Many major projects in the city of Hanoi were built as part of the millennial anniversary. Amongst them, several projects were inaugurated between the 1 and 10 October 2010:

In February 2010, a project was announced in which 1,000 objects would be buried with a message for future generations 1,000 years hence. They included 63 representative items for the 63 provinces of Vietnam and another 937 items from ordinary life, suggested by the people of Hanoi. All objects would be kept in a container of 1,000 liters that symbolizes 1,000 years of Thăng Long – Hanoi, and would be buried on the site of the Hanoi Museum.

Events
The Millennial Anniversary of Hanoi was officially celebrated from 1 to 10 October 2010, with the great celebration (Đại lễ kỉ niệm) held on Sunday, 10 October, which is also the Liberation Day of Hanoi (1954). The ceremony is considered to be one of the most important events in Vietnam in the year 2010, after the official instruction No. 32-CT/TU of the Politburo of the Communist Party of Vietnam, to organize the event. A committee was established with members from the Politburo, the Government of Vietnam, and the City of Hanoi. The main purpose of the ceremony was to express gratefulness to generations of Vietnamese in the past who contributed to the defence and development of the country, and passing this tradition on to future generations. Exactly 1,000 days before the official ceremony, a countdown clock 17 meters high and 8 meters wide was inaugurated at the Bà Kiệu Temple, in front of Hoan Kiem Lake, on 13 January 2008.

The 2010 Millennial Anniversary of Hanoi Football Championship was held from 20 to 24 September.

Surrounding events
Commemorative events were organized not only in Hanoi but also in other provinces, from Phú Thọ to Huế and Ho Chi Minh City. For example, in Bắc Ninh, the native land of Lý Thái Tổ, an incense-offering ceremony at the Lý Bát Đế Shrine and other festivals were held during the ten days from 1 to 10 October 2010, while Ho Chi Minh City organized its own festival, named "Thang Long – Hanoi: 1000 Years of History".

Main events
On 10 June 2009, Prime Minister Nguyễn Tấn Dũng issued a decision approving the detailed scheme of the Millennial Anniversary of Hanoi as following:

Fireworks at My Dinh National Stadium
Following the cancellation of celebratory fireworks in 29 locations around the country due to flooding in Central Vietnam, at 9:00 pm, 10 October 2010, a fireworks show began in Mỹ Đình National Stadium.

See also
 Hanoi Ceramic Mosaic Mural
 Imperial Citadel of Thang Long

References

External links

 Archived official Millennial Anniversary of Hanoi website—

 
2010 in Vietnam
2010 festivals in Asia
21st century in Hanoi
Culture of Hanoi
History of Hanoi
Hanoi